Som Nath Sadhu (1935–1982) was an Indian theatre personality known for his contributions to Kashmiri theatre as an actor, playwright and director.

He was born in 1935 to the notable playwright, Prem Nath Pardase, and started his career by joining Radio Kashmir in 1955. There he had the opportunity to work with another Kashmiri playwright, Pushkar Bhan, with whom he co-wrote several plays for the radio. Janaki, Lwakutboy (Younger Brother), Zi rang (Two Colours), Shama dan (Candlestick), Avihin (Vortex) and Shararat (Mischief) are among his notable works. He also acted in two Kashmiri films, Shayar-e-Kashmir Mahjoor and Mainz Raat.

The Government of India awarded him the fourth highest Indian civilian award of Padma Shri in 1974. He died in 1982 at the age of 47.

References

Recipients of the Padma Shri in arts
1935 births
1982 deaths
Kashmiri people
Dramatists and playwrights from Jammu and Kashmir
Indian male film actors
Indian theatre directors
Indian male radio actors
Indian male dramatists and playwrights
Male actors from Jammu and Kashmir